The February 1990 Mineriad was a mineriad that occurred in Bucharest, the capital of Romania. Although it was at first non-violent, the protests later escalated. This  Mineriad happened 18–19 February, less than a month after the January 1990 Mineriad. Despite the demonstrators' pleas to non-violence, several persons started throwing stones into the  Victoria Palace Government building. Riot police and army forces intervened to restore order, and on the same night, 4,000 miners headed to Bucharest. Opposition leaders and independent media speculated that the demonstration was manipulated by the Securitate and the National Salvation Front. Miners maintained their relative innocence of the violence, claiming that the agitation and most of the brutality was the work of Ion Iliescu's government agents who had infiltrated and disguised themselves as miners.

References

Mineriads
Protests in Romania
History of Romania (1989–present)
History of Bucharest
Jiu Valley
Riots and civil disorder in Romania
1990 riots
February 1990 events in Romania